The Beary (also known as Byari) is a community concentrated along the southwest coast of India, mostly in the Mangalore district of the south Indian state of Karnataka. They are an ethnic group of Indian Muslims with their own distinct culture and identity along with other Muslims of the coastal India, like Nawayaths of the North Canara, Moplahs of the Malabar region & the Labbay of the Coromandel.

Bearys incorporate the local Tulu culture of Tulunadu and diverse traditions of the Moplahs of the Malabar coast.

The Beary community of Tulunadu is one among the earliest Muslim inhabitants of India, with a clear history of more than 950 years. One mosque, Masjid Zeenath Baksh was built in the Bunder area of Mangalore by Malik Deenar, an Arab Da'ee, in 644

Etymology
The word 'Beary' is said to be derived from the Tulu word 'Byara', which means trade or business. Since the major portion of the community was involved in business activities, particularly trading, the local Tulu speaking majority called them as Beary or Byari.

According to the census of 1891, Dakshina Kannada had 92,449 businessmen consisting of 90,345 Bearys, 2,104 Nawayaths and 2,551 non-Muslims. This means that the district had 95,000 Individuals involved in business activities. Records prove that, towards the end of the 19th century, the percentage of Muslim traders in the district was as high as 97.3%, and hence the local Tuluvas rightly named this community as Bearys.

Another popular theory is that the word "Beary" comes from Arabic word "Bahar" (Arabic: بحر).  "Bahar" means "ocean" and "Bahri" (Arabic: بحري) means "sailor or navigator". It is said that the Beary community had trade relations with Arab businessmen travelling to Coastal South India, especially the coastline of Tulunadu Malabar. Inscriptions have been found in Barkur that proves the Arab trade links with Tulunadu.

A third theory says that the word "Beary" is derived from the root word "Malabar". The great Islamic Da'ee, Malik bin Deenar had arrived on the coast of Malabar during the 7th century with a group of Da'ees, or Islamic propagators. A member from his group, Habeeb bin Malik travelled through Tulunadu and preached Islam. He had also built Mosques in Kasaragod, Mangalore and Barkur.

Geographic distribution
The Bearys make up around 80% of the Dakshina Kannada Muslims, with others scattered in the neighbouring Districts of Chikmagalur, Shimoga, Kodagu, Hassan and Uttara Kannada. Mumbai and Goa also have a considerable Beary population. Also, a good number of Bearys are in the Persian Gulf States of the Middle East doing a variety of Jobs. The total Beary population numbers about 1.5 million.

Other sources
There are several documents available which prove that at least 90 Years prior to the invasion of Muhammad bin Qasim in North India, Arab Muslim businessmen were thriving in the south. This proves Islam was prevalent in South India much before Muslim conquerors came to North India. These facts are available in a research document Mykal, written by Ahmed Noori, who conducted a research on the Beary community in 1960.

Noori disputes the claim that the first Muslims came to India along with Alauddin Khalji between 1296 and 1316 AD and points out that according to renowned historian, Henry Miers Elliot, (The History of India as told by its own Historians, Part I) the first ship bearing Muslim travellers was seen on the Indian coast as early as 630 AD. H.G.(Hugh George) Rawlinson, in his book: Ancient and Medieval History of India, claims the first Arab Muslims settled on the Indian coast in the last part of the 7th century AD. Bartholomew also has similar things to say about the early Muslim settlers in India. J. Sturrock in his Madras Districts Manuals: South Kanara, says that Parsi and Arab businessmen settled in different places of the Malabar coast during the 7th century. Ahmed Noori has quoted these and other sources to validate his argument that the Arab and other Settlers came to India much before the Arab, Turk and Afghan conquerors came to North India.

Dr. Susheela P. Upadhyaya, a research scholar in Beary bashe and Beary folklore was of the opinion that the Indian west coast came under Islamic influence long before any other part of India was influenced by Islam or Muslims. Historical research also reveals that during the rule of Banga and Chowta dynasty in the 16th century, Beary men had served as seamen in the naval force. The Chowta dynasty queen, Rani Abbakka had personally supervised the construction of dam at Malali; she had appointed Bearys for boulder work.

An ancient historical work – Keralolpathi – reveals that a king of Malabar, Cheraman Perumal, embraced Islam during the very beginning days of the advent of Islam in the Arab land. Thus the Arabs had royal patronage to practice and propagate Islam in the Malabar area. They were also given the permission of sea trading with a royal patronage. Because of the Da'wah activities of Arab traders, many people embraced Islam and assumed better social status as Muslims.

The Portuguese lost their dominance during the rule of Hyder Ali and Tippu Sultan in Mysore. During this period the Beary Muslims again received royal patronage and intensified their sea trade activities.

Participation in the freedom struggle
The Bearys of the coast participated in the Indian freedom struggle against Portugal and British colonialism. There were a number of Beary men who served in the naval force, and also as soldiers and military commanders in the army of brave queen of Chowta dynasty, Rani Abbakka who ruled in the Ullal region. The Bearys had also joined the army of Nawab Hyder Ali and Tipu Sultan of Mysore. Historians and researchers have enlisted famous Beary personalities who participated in the freedom struggle of India. Many such freedom fighters were imprisoned by British, and a few died during imprisonment.

A sixteenth-century Arabic work of Malabar, Tuhfah al Mujahideen or Tuhafat Ul Mujahideen compiled by Shaikh Zainuddin Makhdoom II (grand son of Shaikh Zainuddin Makhdoom I) had motivated Malabar Muslims which had influence on Bearys of the Tulunadu as well to fight the foreign invaders. Thus the Bearys had actively participated in the freedom struggle against Portugal and British rule.

B. M. Idinabba was a prominent Beary freedom fighter from Karnataka. He was a member of Congress party and was elected as an MLA for three times in the Karnataka state assembly from Ullal constituency. He was one of the activists who fought for the unification of the Kasaragod district of Kerala into the Karnataka state. He has got the credit of being the first president of the Beary Sahithya Sammelana (Beary Literature Summit). He has received many prestigious awards including Rajyotsava Prashasti.

Language

The dialect spoken by Beary (Byaris), is known as Beary Bashe.
While Muslims of Uttara Kannada, called Nawayaths, speak a dialect of Konkani, and the Mappilas of Kerala speak Malayalam (Mappila Malayalam), the Bearys spoke a language made of Malayalam idioms with Tulu phonology and grammar.
This dialect was traditionally known as Mappila Malayalam because of Bearys close contact with Mappilas.
Due to vast influence of Tulu for centuries, it is today considered as a language, close to Malayalam and Tulu.

Beary dialect is largely influenced by the Arabic language. Most of the Bearys especially in coastal area still use a lot of Bearified Arabic words during their daily transactions. Saan, Pinhana, Gubboosu, Dabboosu, Pattir, Rakkasi, Seintaan, Kayeen, are the few words used in Beary bashe that have their roots in Arabic language.

Paunaraga of Maikala
The Paunar Aga or Paunaraga – which literally means sixteen houses – of high status.
Before the advent of the Portuguese, Maikala or Mangalore was one of the main centres of Jains with many Jain Muts, Basadis and also palaces. Especially the Bunder area in Maikala was dominated by rich Jain houses. The Jains who enjoyed economical and social status maintained a system known as Jaina Beedu, which literally means Jain House.

Later when these Jaina Beedu were bought by Muslim merchants who used to regularly travel from Middle East for trade, they still maintained this Beedu system as status symbol. Beedu can be translated in Beary bashe as Aga which means House. The 'Paunaraga' are listed in the table below.

 supreme social status amongst Bearys throughout the 19th century and treated other Bearys as second-class citizens.  The people belonging to these houses were identified as Agakkar which means the People of the House. The history of these houses has a short-lived glory that these houses enjoyed socially and economically. Many of the social customs that the people of Paunaraga observed were special to them.

The lifestyle of Agakkar of the Beary community was largely influenced by Jains. Most of the ornaments used by Agakkar was of Jain pattern and had Jain names. Kharjana is the jewel box used by both Jains and Bearys. Today some of the houses still remain in Bunder area, their surnames tell the glory they once enjoyed.

World Beary Convention
In April 2006, The World Beary Convention was held in Dubai under the banner World Beary Sammelana & Chammana 2006.

The word Chammana stands for felicitation. Since the organizers felicitated a few Beary dignitaries during this world convention held in Dubai, UAE, the convention is called World Beary Sammelana & Chammana 2006. The convention was also attended by several dignitaries which included Dr. B.K.Yusuf, President/Patron of Karnataka Sangha, Dubai, M.B. Abdul Rahiman, Renowned Lawyer and Notary, B.M. Farooque, managing director, Fiza Group, Shiraj Haji. Director Universal Export Tradeways. S.M. Syed Khalil, Galadai Group, Dubai, M.B. Noor Mohamed, MD. Fakruddin, managing director, Ajmal Group, Mel, Abdul Jaleel, Abdussalam Puthige, Editor in Chief, Varthabharathi Kannada Daily, Haju Jamalluddin, chairman, Crescent School, Shamshudeen, P.T. Abdul Rahiman, General Secretary of Indian Islamic Centre, T.S. Shettigar, Jamalludin, Apsara Group, Dr. Viquar Azeem, Dr. Azad Moopen, Ganesh Rai, M.K. Madhavan, Kumar, Indian Association Dubai, Kanukaran Shetty, President Hotel, Prabhakar, KOD, K.P. Ahmed, Yaseen Malpe etc. Some Beary dignitaries have been facilitated during the convention.

World Beary Convention & Chammana
In April 2010, Beary hosts a 2-day event, the World Beary Convention & Mega Cultural Event – Chammana 2010, held during 2 and 3 April at Zabil Ball Room, Radisson Blu Hotel, Creek Side, Dubai. During this convention Beary Personality of the year 2010 award was given to Mr. Mumtaz Ali, and Star of Bearys award for the year 2010 was conferred on Zakariya Bajpe.

Beary Chamber of Commerce and Industry
Bearys chamber of commerce & industry is a non-profit organization set up to create a network between businessmen across communities and countries. It is a union of all businessmen in order to promote and assist innovative businesses for the welfare of the community in the field of commerce and trade.
In what could be termed as a milestone in the history of Bearys, philanthropists and social workers of the community came together on October 27, 2016, to form a Bearys Chamber of Commerce and Industry (BCCI) choosing Haji S M Rasheed as the founding president of BCCI and Imthiyaz as general secretary. Having set up BCCI chapters in various parts of the Karnataka, it has moved to overseas in the year 2018 by opening BCCI chapter in Dubai UAE and Jubail chapter in the year 2019.

Media of the Year award was jointly awarded to Varthabharathi a renowned Kannada daily (published from Mangalore and Bangalore) and Daijiworld.com, a web based newsportal, for their contribution towards media. Abdussalam Puthige, on behalf of Varta Bharti, and representatives of Daijiworld received the award from Mr. C. M. Ibrahim, Former Union Minister.

List of periodicals brought out by Bearys

Some of these periodicals are still being published and reaching to the hands of a sizeable population of Tulunadu and other adjacent districts and to the Persian Gulf States.

Some peculiar names of Bearys
Typically, Muslim community people name their children for Arabic roots. But olden day Bearys had some strange names which are not seen anywhere else in the Muslim world. Although those peculiar names are now vanishing, here are some such examples:

Kayiri, Sayiri, Sayirabba, Cheyya, Cheyyabba, Saunhi, Kayinhi, Sekunhi, Baduva, Mayabba, Puthabba, Hammabba, Cheyyabba, Ijjabba, Kunha, Kunhi, Bava, Bavunhi, Kunhibavu, Puttubavu, Unha, Unhi, Unhimon, Iddinabba, Podiya, Podimonu, Pallikunhi, Kunhipalli, Kidavaka, Abbu, Abbonu, Chakaka, Addiyaka (Addi), Pudiyampule.

List of the Books related to Beary culture

These books are available at the largest library in the world, the Library of Congress in Washington, D.C., US.

Ornaments
The beary women have excessive love for ornaments and uses it on every possible occasion such as Mangila, Sunnat Mangila, Appate Mangila, Birnd, Moilanji and other social gatherings. There were different types of ornaments used by beary community in past which is at the verge of vanishing today due to the cultural invasion and urbanisation. These ornaments are made out of mainly gold and silver and used for the ornamentation of head, ears, neck, waist, wrist, fingers and feet. Beary research scholars are of the opinion that Beary ornaments were largely influenced by Jain ornament patterns. The ornament storage box used by Bearys was made out of brass and other metals was also used by Jain community and was called Kharjana by both Bearys and Jains.

Cuisine

Beary cuisine is highly influenced by the South Indian Cuisine. Just like Mangalorean cuisine it uses a lot of coconut, curry leaves, ginger, chilli and spices like pepper and cardamom. Beary cuisine boasts of a special kind of biryani, which is very different from the other types made elsewhere. Rice preparations, both fresh and dry fish, meat and eggs enjoy top place in Beary daily menu.

A few traditional dishes very popular amongst all the Tulu communities have unique names in Beary dialect.  (a distorted version of Arabic ),  are to name a few.

Beary Literature 
Beary Sahitya Academy is a union of Beary speaking people located mainly Tulu Nadu, which includes coastal districts of Dakshina Kannada & Udupi in Karnataka State and Kasaragod in Kerala state. The academy aims to give proper guidelines for empowerment of language to central government and state government and central academy. To encourage Beary language the academy established libraries and research centers for its developments.
On January 4, 2022 The foundation laying ceremony for the construction of new building for Karnataka Beary Sahitya Academy at Thokkottu was held.
It is scheduled to be inaugurated soon.

Beary organisations

Today the Beary community of coastal Karnataka is surging ahead in diverse fields like international business, education, medicine and technology. Bearys have also formed various social and cultural organisations of diversified interests.

Bearys Welfare Association
Bearys Welfare Association is based in Bengaluru, the capital of Karnataka state. The association came into being on 21 March 1988 with a motive to provide a means of communication and integration, and also to provide a platform to work towards the betterment of the Beary community in all aspects of life.

Bearys Welfare Association has organised a number of cultural programs every year right from its very inception. Beary Prakashana is its sister concern and involved in print and publication activities. It has published a number of titles on Beary culture, Beary bashe, Beary history, and also on research studies on Bearys.

In July 2010, Bearys Welfare Association distributed 80 scholarships for the needy.

Bearys Welfare Forum
Bearys Welfare Forum of Abu Dhabi, popularly known as BWF is an association of Beary expatriates in Abu Dhabi, United Arab Emirates.  It does community activities and mainly community welfare activities.

BWF was established in the year 2004 with an intention of working for all sections of the society. It has helped the victims of Communal riots in Mangalore by providing medical assistance and other aids. The BWF gained popularity when it held Mass marriage ceremony of twelve pairs of poor and deserving youth at the Shadi Mahal of Mangalore city.

In July 2008, BWF felicitated U. T. Khader for his outstanding social work.

In July 2009, Bearys Welfare Forum, Abu Dhabi, organised a mass wedding ceremony at Milagres Auditorium.  Sixteen couples were solemnised in marriage by Kazi Al Haj Abdulla Musliar Chembarika.

In October 2014, Bearys Welfare Forum Abu Dhabi organized 5th mass marriage ceremony at Milagres Auditorium in Hampankatta. The forum had arranged weddings for 65 couples, economically backward members of the Muslim community in the previous editions.

In March 2019, Bearys Welfare Forum accorded warm farewell to Y Sudhir Kumar Shetty, who successfully served as president of UAE Exchange.

Bearys Cultural Forum
Bearys Cultural Forum, in the United Arab Emirates, was constituted to provide education to the people of the coastal parts of the State of Karnataka. BCF's main objective is to promote, educate and create social, cultural and educational awareness amongst the Bearys and the population of the coastal Karnataka State and the UAE. The BCF regularly conducts cultural, sports, talent search, educational activities, Career Guidance Seminars, Iftar Party, etc. every year. BCF also provides educational scholarships to students for pursuing their higher studies in the field of Medicines, Engineering, Pharmacy, Business, Nursing, Journalism, Dentistry, etc. BCF is now committed to conduct "World Beary Convention & Chammana" in Dubai, U.A.E.

In April 2012, 'Chammana 2012' hosted by Bearys Cultural Forum, Dubai, at the Radisson Blue Hotel, Dubai, attracted more than 1,200 people to its programme.

In August 2018, BCF distributed scholarship to the downtrodden community. B. M. Farooq MLC inaugurated the ceremony. Dr B K Yusuf, president of BCF presided over the function. T R Suresh, police commissioner of Mangaluru, extended his wishes. Khazi Al Haj E K Ibrahim of Krishnapura Juma Masjid offered the prayers.

Nearly 500 merit students of Udupi and Dakshina Kannada district received the scholarship. 55 women were given the sewing machines. Students were given the merit award and also felicitated on the occasion.

MLCs Ivan D'Souza and K Harish Kumar, former MLA Mohiuddin Bava, former MLC Captain Ganesh Karnik, registrar of Mangaluru university Dr M M Khan, managing director of Vishwas Bawa builders Abdul Rauf Puttige, president of Beary Academy Hajee Mohammed Karambar, former president B A Mohammed Hanif, working president of DKSC Hatim Kunhi, former senate member P V Mohan, JD (S) leaders M B Sadashiv, Vittal Mohammaed Kunhi, president of BCF scholarship committee M E Muloor, vice-presidents Abdul Latif Mulki and Amiruddin S I were present.

Patron of BCF B M Mumtaz Ali welcomed the gathering. Ibrahim Musliyar recited the Kiraath. The programme was compered by chief secretaries of BCF Dr Kaup Mohammed and Rafiq Master.

M.G Rahim (Capman Media Makers ) 
M.G Rahim,  has been active in 'Beary Movement' for the last eight years. It has felicitated Beary poets, writers and others who have come up with remarkable achievements in the society. "beary naseehath majlis", "Surmatho Kannu", "Maafi Mushkil", "Pernal nilaavu", "Moilanjipoo", "Maikalthoraja", stage programme "beary oppane kali", "beary kolkali", "pernal nilaavu", Eid special programme on coastal T.V channel yearly and films like "Abba" are some of the productions of Capman Media Makers.

Akshara santha harekala hajabba was awarded Padmashri on 8 November 2021 who is among the notable bearys of Dakshina Kannada.

References

Other sources
Bearys of the coast, Article in Deccan Herald 12 December 1997 by B.M. Hanif.
H.G. Rawlinson, Ancient and Medieval History of India.
Sturrock, J., Madras District Manual. South Kanara (2 vols., Madras, 1894–1895).
Influence of Muslim thought on the east retrieved 21 May 2006.
Muslims in Dakshina Kannada: a historical study up to 1947 and survey of recent developments, Author Wahab Doddamane, A.  Green Words publication. Mangalore, 1993.
Influence Of Islam On Indian Culture by Dr. Tara Chand.
Dr. Susheela P. Upadhyaya.
Beary Welfare Forum celebrates 10th anniversary.

Karnataka society
Social groups of India
Muslim communities of Karnataka
Mangalorean society
Social groups of Karnataka